The following is a list of ambassadors of the United States, or other chiefs of mission, to Colombia and its predecessor states. The title given by the United States State Department to this position is currently Ambassador Extraordinary and Minister Plenipotentiary.

Gran Colombia
The following were commissioned either Chargés d'Affaires or Ministers to Gran Colombia.

New Granada
The following were commissioned as either Chargés d'Affaires or Ministers to New Granada.

United States of Colombia
The following were commissioned as Ministers to the United States of Colombia.

Republic of Colombia
The following were commissioned as either Ministers or Ambassadors to the Republic of Colombia.

See also
Colombia – United States relations
Foreign relations of Colombia
Ambassadors of the United States

References

United States Department of State: Background notes on Colombia

External links
 United States Department of State: Chiefs of Mission for Colombia
 United States Department of State: Colombia
 United States Embassy in Colombia

Colombia
Main
United State